Maiestas bispinosus is a species of bug from the Cicadellidae family that is endemic to India. It was formerly placed within Recilia, but a 2009 revision moved it to Maiestas.

References

Insects described in 1998
Endemic fauna of India
Insects of India
Maiestas